Megacraspedus orenburgensis is a moth of the family Gelechiidae. It is found in Russia (the southern Ural). The habitat consists of chalk steppe.

The wingspan is 11.5–14.5 mm. The ground colour of the forewings is greyish white, overlaid with
brown-tipped. The hindwings are white.

Etymology
The species name refers to its geographical origin, Orenburg district in the Southern Ural Mountains.

References

Moths described in 2010
Megacraspedus